Chanteloup is a commune in the Manche department in Normandy in north-western France.

Places and monuments
Church Saint-Pierre de Chanteloup which depends on the parish of Our Lady of Hope on the deanery of Country-Villedieu Granville.

See also
Communes of the Manche department

References

Communes of Manche